Vlora Çitaku (born 10 October 1980) is a Kosovar Albanian politician and diplomat who served as the Ambassador of Kosovo to the United States. She formerly served as Consul General of Kosovo in New York.

Before joining Kosovo's diplomatic corps, Vlora served as Minister for European Integration of Kosovo. She was noted as one of the most successful ministers of the 2011-2014 Kosovo government. She relinquished her MP seat in the Kosovo Assembly upon taking the governmental position, which she won as one of the top three most voted candidates.

Career
Vlora Çitaku was only a teen when she became interpreter and a stringer for major Western news outlets at the onset of Kosovo war. She later became a refugee during the Kosovo War and has been involved with politics since 1999. She initially became spokesperson for the KLA and joined the PDK after the formation of the party in the post-war Kosovo. She was a Member of Parliament in two mandates. She states that she has overcome the stereotypes in politics that one must be old and a man.

She was the acting Minister of Foreign Affairs between 18 October 2010 and 22 February 2011.

Controversy
At the 15th anniversary of the start of the NATO bombing of Yugoslavia, Çitaku posted an image on Twitter that provoked political controversy. She replaced the well known slogan for Nike, “Just Do It”, with the words, “NATO Air Just Do It” – with a warplane next to it. Serbia's Ministry of Foreign Affairs called the gesture disrespectful to Serbs civilians killed by NATO air strikes. Analysts also considered it in bad taste. Nike, Inc. also said that the image "did not represent their officials stand" - and that company was in no way involved in posting the tweet or in creating the image.

In April 2019, Çitaku tweeted comparing an episode of Game of Thrones to the history between Serbia and Kosovo, while she put Serbia in the role of White Walkers, the main villains that are portrayed as a supernatural threat to humankind. Her tweet prompted widespread reactions, including a retweet from Stefana Miladinović.

Notes

References

External links
 Kosovo Assembly Profile

1980 births
Living people
Government ministers of Kosovo
Foreign ministers of Kosovo
Politicians from Podujevo
Female foreign ministers
Kosovan women diplomats
Yugoslav refugees
21st-century women politicians
Women government ministers of Kosovo
Ambassadors of Kosovo to the United States
Women ambassadors